Wolfgang Amadeus Mozart composed six sonatas for keyboard with accompaniment of violin (or flute) and cello, K. 10–15, in late 1764 in London during the Mozart family's grand tour of Europe. Queen Charlotte (the wife of King George III) commissioned them on 25 October and the works were dedicated to her on 18 January 1765. They were published as Mozart's "Opus III" by his father Leopold at 20 Frith Street, Soho, London, where the Mozarts lived from September 1764 until after May 1765.

The keyboard part was originally written for a harpsichord. Unlike Mozart's other works for violin and keyboard, the first edition was printed with a separate ad libitum cello part for all six sonatas. The part mostly doubles the principal notes in the left hand part of the keyboard in the manner of Haydn's early piano trios (e.g. Trio No. 5 in G minor, Hob. XV:1), or a set of similarly scored sonatas (Op. 2, WB 43–48) by Queen Charlotte's music teacher Johann Christian Bach. Bach befriended the young Mozart and became an important influence on the younger composer's evolving style.

The Neue Mozart-Ausgabe therefore includes the works with the piano trios, unlike the earlier Alte Mozart-Ausgabe and the various editions of the Köchel catalogue which list them as violin sonatas (or flute sonatas).

Sonata in B-flat, K. 10

Sonata in G, K. 11

Sonata in A, K. 12

Sonata in F, K. 13

Sonata in C, K. 14

Sonata in B-flat, K. 15

Notes

External links

Naxos.com  liner notes

010-015
1764 compositions
Music dedicated to nobility or royalty